Lloyd Glasspool and Harri Heliövaara were the defending champions but chose not to defend their title.

Sadio Doumbia and Fabien Reboul won the title after defeating Dustin Brown and Szymon Walków 7–6(7–5), 6–4 in the final.

Seeds

Draw

References

External links
 Main draw

Open International de Tennis de Roanne - Doubles